Pak Un-sil (born 21 July 1972) is a North Korean ice dancer. He competed in the ice dance event at the 1992 Winter Olympics.

References

1972 births
Living people
North Korean male ice dancers
Olympic figure skaters of North Korea
Figure skaters at the 1992 Winter Olympics
Place of birth missing (living people)